Miss Grand Philippines is a female national beauty pageant in the Philippines, launched in 2014 by John Dela Vega, who was also the founder of the "House of JDV," one of the country's most recognized pageant training camps. The winner of the contest represents the country at its parent international platform, Miss Grand International. In cooperation with the Binibining Pilipinas Charities, Inc. (BPCI), some national finalists of the Binibining Pilipinas pageant were assigned to participate in the Miss Grand International pageant in 2013 and 2015. 

In 2016, the competition license was transferred to the BPCI, and then to another pageant organizer, the ALV Pageant Circle, in late 2022. Under the supervision of the BPCI in 2016–2022, the majority of Filipino representatives at the Miss Grand International pageant were directly determined through the Binibining Pilipinas contest, except for the 2020 season, wherein the runner-up of the previous edition was appointed to participate. The Miss Grand Philippines pageant, on the other hand, is expected to return as a separate platform in 2023 once the license is passed to the organization chaired by Arnold Vegafria, ALV Pageant Circle.

Since the inception of the Miss Grand International pageant in 2013, Philippines representatives have never won the contest but hold a record of six placements; the highest position is the first runner-up, which was obtained by Nicole Cordoves and Samantha Bernardo in 2016 and 2020, respectively.

History
Since its debut in the Miss Grand International Pageant in 2013, the Philippines has only had one Miss Grand national pageant, which took place in 2014. Under the direction of John Dela Vega, who served as the national licensee from 2013 to 2015, the contest was held on August 16 at the GT-Toyota Asian Cultural Center in Quezon, and Kimberly Karlsson of Oriental Mindoro was named the winner, beating out the other eighteen participants. The remaining representatives were either chosen on the Binibining Pilipinas stage or appointed, such as Parul Shah, who was elected Binibining Pilipinas Tourism in the Binibining Pilipinas 2014 pageant but was later assigned to represent the country at the  pageant instead, due to the cancellation of the Miss Tourism International 2014 pageant, as well as Samantha Bernardo, who was appointed Miss Grand Philippines 2020 after obtaining the second runner-up position at the Binibining Pilipinas 2019 pageant.

The national pageant of Miss Grand Philippines is planned to return in 2023 after the Miss World Philippines organizer, chaired by Arnold Vegafria, ALV Pageant Circle, took over the franchise from Binibining Pilipinas Charities, Inc. in late 2022.

Editions
The following list is the edition detail of the Miss Grand Philippines contest, since its inception in 2014.

Representatives at Miss Grand International
Color keys

Gallery

References

External links

 

Philippines